

As leader/co-leader 
This is the discography for American jazz drummer, pianist, composer and bandleader Jack DeJohnette. Artist, band and label names are only linked at first appearance (also as an indicator).

As sideman 
The table lists approximately all of the recordings Jack DeJohnette was part of, for the most part as drummer. The default of the sortable table is the "Date" that signifies the year and month (if possible) of the recording session(s). Names of musicians, bands and labels are only linked by first appearance.

References 

Discographies of American artists
Jazz discographies